Bartolomeo Spina (born at Pisa about 1475; died at Rome, 1546) was an Italian Dominican theologian and scholastic philosopher.

Life 

He joined the Dominican Order at Pisa in 1494. He was involved in the attempted take-over of the Milanese convent of Sant'Eustorgio by the Observant friars of the Congregation of Lombardy before becoming master of studies at the Dominican studio in Bologna in 1513–4.  He served as inquisitorial vicar in Modena from 1517–9, where he was involved in prosecuting witches, and then regent master at S. Domenico in Bologna in the early 1530s. He was appointed (1536) by the Venetian Senate to the chair of theology at the University of Padua. He was also for a time socius of the Master-General of the Order of Preachers, and prior provincial of the Holy Land.

In July, 1542, he was made Master of the Sacred Palace by Pope Paul III, and during the four years that he discharged the duties of that office he rendered services to the Holy See and to the Fathers of the Council of Trent, regarding many difficult and mooted questions. As Master of the Sacred Palace, he was said to have wanted to move against Copernicus' De revolutionibus, only stopped by his death. From the year 1518 Spina was engaged in a heated controversy with his famous confrère, Cardinal Cajetan. Still more harsh was his opposition to Ambrose Catharinus, whom he denounced as guilty of heresy to Paul III about the beginning of the year 1546.

Works 
The most important of Spina's works are:

"Tutela Veritatis de Immortalitate Animæ contra Petrum Pomponatium" and
"Flagellum in Tres Libros Apologiæ Pomponatii de Immortalitate Animæ",

both published in 1518. Of special interest are also

"Tractatus de Strigibus et Lamiis" (Venice, 1523), and
"Apologiæ Tres adversus Joann. Franc. Ponzinibium Jurisperitum" (Venice, 1525).

He also edited many works of Thomas Aquinas, including his commentary on the Physics, Metaphysics, and logical works, as well as some of his Biblical commentaries (Matthew, Isaiah, Jeremiah, and Lamentations).

In his treatise "De Conceptione B. Mariæ Virg." (Venice, 1533), Spina opposed the doctrine of the Immaculate Conception.

References 

Alva y Astorga, Monumenta Dominicana: pro immac. concept. (Louvain, 1666), 4 sq.;
Jacques Échard, Script. Ord. Prœd., II, 126 sq.;

Hugo von Hurter, Nomenclator.

Attribution

1546 deaths
Italian Dominicans
Scholastic philosophers
16th-century Italian Roman Catholic theologians
Year of birth uncertain